The 2008 Bassetlaw District Council election took place on 1 May 2008 to elect members of Bassetlaw District Council in Nottinghamshire, England. One third of the council was up for election.

After the election, the composition of the council was:
Conservative 30
Labour 16
Others 2

Election result

Ward results

Beckingham

Carlton

Clayworth

East Retford East

East Retford North

East Retford South

East Retford West

Harworth

Sutton

Tuxford and Trent

Worksop East

Worksop North

Worksop North-East

Worksop North-West

Worksop South

Worksop South-East

References

2008 Bassetlaw election result

2008 English local elections
2008
2000s in Nottinghamshire